Ag Against Hunger is a non-profit organization based in Salinas, California that collects surplus produce from Monterey, San Benito and Santa Cruz County growers on the central coast of California. This fresh produce is then distributed to food banks throughout the west coast of the United States.

Ag Against Hunger was the brainchild of Jess Brown, Executive Director of the Santa Cruz County Farm Bureau, Willy Elliott-McCrae, Executive Director of Second Harvest Food Bank and Tim Driscoll of Driscoll Strawberry Associates. In 1990 they developed a system to distribute the abundance of surplus crops grown in the tri-county area to the hungry. Their simple solution has become a model for produce recovery and distribution programs.

Ag Against Hunger's trucks collect produce from approximately 50 different growers and shippers in the tri-county area. It is then distributed to food banks that make the fresh produce donations available to more than 240 nonprofit human service agencies and feeds 75,000 low-income people in the tri-county area each month and hundreds of thousands more throughout California and the West Coast.

When local food banks are satisfied, Ag Against Hunger provides California Emergency Foodlink, a statewide food distribution program, fresh produce which is distributed to over 50 food banks and community pantries in other parts of the state. After state organizations receive all the produce they needed, Ag Against Hunger works with food organizations in Arizona, Washington, Oregon, Colorado, and Utah to feed people throughout the West Coast.

Gleaning
After harvest, there is an abundance of high quality, marketable produce left in the fields which cannot be harvested economically or does not meet commercial standards. Typically, it is tilled under in preparation for planting new crops. Ag Against Hunger’s gleaning program coordinates the picking of crops left behind after commercial harvest and the donation of the food. In 2006, volunteers harvested over 55,000 pounds of produce that would have otherwise been disked underground.

See also

 List of food banks

External links
Official website
Harry Cline, Ag Against Hunger provides fresh produce for needy, July 5, 2005, Western Farm Press. Retrieved 12 September 2007.

Food banks in California
Non-profit organizations based in California
Agricultural organizations based in the United States